Raoul Petouille (3 January 1894 – 4 March 1978) was a French racing cyclist. He rode in the 1921 Tour de France.

References

1894 births
1978 deaths
French male cyclists
Place of birth missing